Chaar Sahibzaade is a 2014 Indian Punjabi - Hindi 3D computer-animated historical drama film written and directed by Harry Baweja. It is based on the sacrifices of the sons of the 10th Sikh guru Guru Gobind Singh—Sahibzada Ajit Singh, Jujhar Singh, Zorawar Singh, and Fateh Singh. Om Puri provided the film's narration, and the voice artists for various characters were kept anonymous. It was also the highest grossing Punjabi film when it was released. It was surpassed by Carry on Jatta 2 in July 2018.

Produced by Pammi Baweja under the banner Baweja Movies, the film was released on 6 November 2014 to positive reviews from critics and audiences, and the movie emerged as a major box office success, eventually becoming the highest grossing animated movie ever to have been produced in India.

Synopsis 

The film starts with invasions of India by the Mughal Empire. Guru Tegh Bahadur (the ninth Guru of Sikhdom) sacrificed his life for the rights and freedom of religion of the Kashmiri pandits. Following this, Guru Gobind Singh founded the Khalsa to counter the invading forces with martyrdom as the fundamental principle of defence. The film depicts the Battle of Anandpur (1700) in which the Mughal General Painde Khan was slain by Guru Gobind Singh. The film also depicts the Battle of Chamkaur which took place in December, 1704 CE in which forty two Sikhs (under Guru Gobind Singh) fought bravely against ten lakh Mughal forces under the command of Wazir Khan. In the battle of Chamkaur, both the elder sons of Guru Gobind Singh Sahibzada Ajit Singh and Sahibzada Jujhar Singh were martyred in combat. The Mughals were composed of large numbers, yet ultimately failed to capture Guru Gobind Singh, culminating in their defeat. The younger sons of Guru Gobind Singh, Sahibzada Zorawar Singh and Sahibzada Fateh Singh, were taken to Wazir Khan's palace and were executed by the Mughal ruler of Sirhind. Wazir Khan gave orders that the masons immure both sons into a section of the city's wall.

Cast 
 Om Puri as the Narrator
 Harman Baweja

Production 

Pammi Baweja produced the film under the banner of Baweja movies. The Bollywood actor Harman Baweja is the creative producer of the film and Harry Baweja directed the film. The production took nearly five years. Harry Bajwa spent two years doing research for the project. He met the "Dharam Parchar Committee" of Shiromani Gurdwara Parbandhak Committee and discussed his project. It is prohibited in Sikhism to depict Sikh Gurus in an animated form and their still images were used in this film. The voice artists for other characters were kept anonymous. The film was produced in Punjabi and Hindi and also dubbed in American English. Animation work for the movie was handled by iREALTIES and the film trailer was launched in Mumbai.

Music 

The main title tracks are sung by Sukhwinder Singh, whilst other tracks are sung by many other various artists. "Sochte Hue Guru Aaram Karti
Hui Foujon Mein Aye" is a narration poem by Om Puri. This track is dialogue of the movie but was chosen to be added into the soundtrack.  Most music director's were kept anonymous. The soundtrack was released through
the Saga Music label

Reception

Critical reception 
The film received mostly positive reviews from critics for its story, animation and in-depth research. Jasmine Singh of The Tribune gave the movie 4.5 stars out of 5. He praised its story, calling it a realistic portrayal and commending the delivery of dialogue and narration by Puri. He regarded the animation quality highly especially as it was the first 3D animated Punjabi film. Shubha Shetty Saha of Mid-Day gave the film 3 stars and acclaimed the story for its sincerity but criticized the animation for its apparent lack of flexibility and expressions on the faces of characters. Jesse Brar of PunjabiReviews.com also positively reviewed the story. He complimented the film's pacing and called it realistic by showing younger sons more like children and not morally objectified. He also approved of the film for keeping the story historical and "saving itself from becoming religious propaganda." Renuka Vyavahare of The Times of India gave the film 3.5 stars. She enjoyed the film overall and recommended it for children to show them real Indian heroes.

Box office 
In India, the film earned 3.5–4 crore in the first week. In total it earned  at the international box office across its opening weekend.

DVD/Blu-ray Release 
It is available on the DVD format and was never released on Blu-Ray.

Sequel

A sequel titled Chaar Sahibzaade: Rise of Banda Singh Bahadur was released on 11 November 2016.

See also
 Punjabi cinema
 List of indian animated feature films

References

External links 
 

2014 films
Punjabi-language Indian films
Films shot in India
History of Sikhism
Indian historical drama films
Indian animated films
Films set in Punjab, India
Films scored by Jaidev Kumar
Films scored by Anand Raj Anand
Films scored by Harry Baweja
Indian 3D films
2014 3D films
Films set in the 18th century
Films directed by Harry Baweja
Films about Sikhism
Indian computer-animated films
Films set in the Mughal Empire
Cultural depictions of Indian monarchs
Cultural depictions of Sikh gurus
Memorials to Guru Gobind Singh